Shrewsbury Township may refer to:
 Shrewsbury Township, New Jersey
 Shrewsbury Township, York County, Pennsylvania
 Shrewsbury Township, Sullivan County, Pennsylvania
 Shrewsbury Township, Lycoming County, Pennsylvania

See also
Shrewsbury, the county town of Shropshire, in the West Midlands region of England
Shrewsbury (disambiguation)

Township name disambiguation pages